Ali Azimi is an Iranian musician-singer and guitarist. He was the vocalist and songwriter of the band Radio Tehran until the early 2010s. After they disbanded, Ali embarked on a solo career, and released his debut album Mr. Mean in 2013. Ali released his third album in 2019.

Biography
Born and raised in Tehran, Iran, Ali Azimi began his interest in music at a young age. Coming from a musical family, he self-learned to play the Piano and studied classical guitar with Bagher Moazen. Azimi got his bachelor's in Mechanical Engineering at University of Tehran and Masters in the United Kingdom in the same field.

In his early 30s, after years of work and study in the field of Mechanical Engineering, Ali Azimi set aside his work as an engineer in the UK and began to follow his passion for music. The song "33" from the album, Mr. Mean and the song Tatilat, from Radio Tehran album are both based on this experience.

During the same time, Ali founded his own production company Sakkou, which documented underground Iranian music to help promote his fellow musicians who are unable to freely express their love for music in the Islamic Republic of Iran.

After quitting his engineering career Ali Azimi went to Iran and in the year 1388 (2009) and formed the Iranian rock band Radio Tehran. Leading this new band, Ali recorded the album 88. Touching on the issues of the young Iranians, the album gave a fresh sound and perspective within the Iranian alternative music scene.

Departing from his previous band, Ali Azimi's first solo album, Mr. Mean, was released in October 2013. This album includes major hit songs such as "Prelude", and "Aghaye Past".

The music video for the song "Mr. Mean" was the first prize winner at Farhang Foundation's short film festival.

After a successful tour of Europe, America and Canada in 2014 for his album, Mr. Mean, Ali Azimi released his second solo album "Ezzat Ziad" in June 2016 with hit songs such as "Farda Soraghe Man Bia" Featuring "Mohsen Namjoo" and "Zendegi" based on a poem by "Houshang Ebtehaj". 
Ali Azimi and his band went on a grand tour in autumn 2016 and covered 15 cities across Europe and North America.

Of Love & Other Evils 
Ali released his anticipated third album on October first, 2019 titled Of Love and Other Evils. His songs like Heyhot and Panahandeh are gaining much popularity among the Persians despite the fact that this is a newly released album. Ali has announced that he will be going on a worldwide tour following his album release; beginning with Europe in the Fall of 2019.

Discography

with radio Tehran band
88

Solo albums

2013 Mr. Mean
2016 Ezzat ziad (Till Glory Finds Us)
2019 Az eshgh va shayatin-e digar (Of Love & Other Evils)
2022 Kahrobaye Arezou

Critical response
Ali Azimi has been interviewed by BBC World, MBC Persia, ManotoTV and Roozonline.

References

External links 

 Ali Azimi's Official Website

1977 births
Living people
Iranian guitarists
21st-century Iranian male singers
Iranian rock musicians
Iranian rock singers
Musicians from Tehran
Persian-language singers
Singers from Tehran
University of Tehran alumni